Elobey Chico, or Little Elobey, is a small island off the coast of Equatorial Guinea, lying near the mouth of the Mitémélé River. The island is now uninhabited but was once the de facto colonial capital of the Spanish territory of Río Muni. Officially, the island was associated with Fernando Pó, but the connection seemed to be little more than fiction. The majority of the factories were owned by Hamburg Merchants.

See also
Elobey, Annobón and Corisco

References

Islands of Equatorial Guinea
Uninhabited islands